Coelacanthus ("hollow spine") is a genus of extinct coelacanths that first appeared during the Permian period. It was the first genus of coelacanths described, about a century before the discovery of the extant coelacanth Latimeria. The order Coelacanthiformes is named after it.

Description
Coelacanthus bears a superficial similarity to the living coelacanth Latimeria, though it was smaller, and had a more elongated head. The fin rays of the caudal fin are hollow, which gave Coelacanthus its name. The name is an adaptation of the Modern Latin cœlacanthus ("hollow spine"), from the Greek κοῖλ-ος (koilos; "hollow") and ἄκανθ-α (akantha; "spine"). These hollow spines are a typical feature of coelacanths.

Distribution and time
The type species Coelacanthus granulatus was described from the late Permian (Wuchiapingian) Kupferschiefer of Germany and equivalent Marl Slate of England. Coelacanthus is primarily known from Late Permian and Early Triassic deposits in Europe and Canada, although the referred species C. welleri, known from Iowa, is of Late Devonian (Famennian) age. It survived the Permian–Triassic extinction event, and one species, C. banffensis, is known from the Early Triassic.

Several other species that were first referred to Coelacanthus were later reallocated to other genera. Coelacanthus minor was considered by Woodward (1891) as potentially belonging to the Triassic genus Heptanema, while Martin and Wenz (1984) considered Coelacanthus lunzensis a possible synonym of Garnbergia. Coelacanthus madagascariensis from the Early Triassic of Madagascar was reattributed to the genus Rhabdoderma, and Coelacanthus evolutus is a synonym of Whiteia woodwardi.

References

External links
Mikko's Phylogeny Archive on Coelacanthiformes

Coelacanthidae
Prehistoric lobe-finned fish genera
Permian bony fish
Triassic bony fish
Triassic extinctions
Prehistoric fish of Europe
Prehistoric fish of North America
Fossil taxa described in 1836
Taxa named by Louis Agassiz